Alminstone Cross is a village in Devon, England.

References

Villages in Devon